= Anterior border =

Anterior border may refer to:

- Anterior margin of pancreas
- Anterior border of lung
